Stacy Lee Kamano (born September 17, 1974) is an American television actress known for her role as Kekoa Tanaka on Baywatch.

Career
Kamano was born and raised in Honolulu, Hawaii. At the age of 11, she won the title "Miss Tropical Pre-Teen Hawaii" and decided to pursue a career as a model and actress. Her mother is of German, Russian and Polish descent, and her father is Japanese.

Kamano joined the cast of the television series Baywatch in 1999, playing the role of lifeguard Kekoa Tanaka. Kamano was a cast member in the show's final two seasons. Kamano has also hosted the television series Extreme Sports and Hotlines.

Personal life
Kamano attended Kalaheo High School, in Kailua, Oahu, Hawaii from 1991 to 1992.

Partial filmography

References

External links

1974 births
American television actresses
American actresses of Japanese descent
American people of Russian descent
American people of German descent
American people of Polish descent
Living people
Actresses from Honolulu
21st-century American women